Callistomimus elegans is a species of ground beetles in the genus Callistomimus. It is found in South Africa

References

External links 

 Callistomimus elegans on carabidae.pro

Licininae
Beetles described in 1848
Endemic beetles of South Africa